The Swedish Publicists' Association (Swedish: Publicistklubben) is a Swedish organisation devoted to promoting freedom of the press and free speech in journalism.

The Association was founded in Stockholm in 1874 and today it has approximately 5,200 members and seven chapters in different regions of Sweden. It arranges debates on current topics and hands out prizes as well as scholarships, funded by a donation from Lars Johan Hierta.

Prizes

Freedom of Speech prize 
This prize is given in memory of Anna Politkovskaya, the murdered Russian journalist, writer, and human rights activist. 
2015: Khadija Ismayilova
2013: Michail Afanasiev
2012: Johan Persson, Jonas Fahlman & Martin Schibbye
2011: Fredrik Gertten
2010: Amun Abdullahi Mohamed
2009: Elin Jönsson
2008: Ulf Johansson, editor-in-chief, Nerikes Allehanda newspaper.
2007: Dawit Isaak

References

External links
Official site 

Organizations established in 1874
Freedom of expression organizations
Journalism awards
Swedish journalism organizations
1874 establishments in Sweden